Cryptandra amara, commonly known as bitter cryptandra or pretty pearlflower, is a species of flowering plant in the family Rhamnaceae and is endemic to eastern Australia. It is a densely-branched  shrub with clustered, more or less linear to egg-shaped or elliptic leaves, and tube-shaped white flowers arranged on the ends of branchlets.

Description 
It is often extensively branched, the branchlets tending to be rigid, sometimes spiny, and covered in fine, star-shaped hairs. The flowers are white, tube-shaped or bell-shaped, and arranged at the ends of branchlets, sometimes singly or in small groups, sometimes in spike-like clusters of many flowers. Flowering mainly occurs from August to October and the fruit of Cryptandra amara is a capsule that divides into single-seeded fruitlets. The seeds are reddish-brown in colour, with a short aril.

Taxonomy
Cryptandra amara was first formally described in 1808 by James Edward Smith in The Cyclopaedia from specimens collected by "Dr. White". The specific epithet (amara) means "bitter".

Distribution and habitat
Cryptandra amara grows on shallow, often rocky soils, in grassland, shrubland, woodland and heathy forest in eastern Australia. It is found in south-east Queensland, through most of New South Wales, in central, northern and eastern Victoria and southern South Australia. In Tasmania it mainly occurs in the Southern Midlands with scattered population in other places.

Conservation status
Pretty pearlflower is listed as "endangered" under the Tasmanian Government Threatened Species Protection Act 1995.

References

amara
Rosales of Australia
Flora of New South Wales
Flora of Queensland
Flora of Victoria (Australia)
Flora of South Australia
Flora of Tasmania
Plants described in 1808
Taxa named by James Edward Smith